Revelation is the ninth studio album by British new wave rock band Ultravox, released in 1993. The album was issued after the dissolution of the band in 1988 and the reformation of a new five-piece line-up in 1992, with Tony Fenelle as lead vocalist and keyboard player Billy Currie as the only original member left.

Track listing

Personnel
Ultravox
Billy Currie – synthesizer, keyboards, viola, violin
Tony Fenelle – guitar, lead vocals

Additional musicians
Gerry Laffy – additional guitars on tracks 1 and 7
Neal Wilkinson – drums on tracks 1 and 4
Jackie Williams – background vocals on tracks 2 and 3
Richard Niles – conductor, string arrangements on tracks 1 and 10

Production
Rod Gammons – producer, engineer, programming, mixing on track 3
Jonathan Garfield - Assistant recording engineer
Mike Bigwood – strings recording engineer
Graham Bonnet – mixing on tracks 1, 4-8, 10
Rupert Coulson – mixing on track 2
Dave Ford – mixing on track 9
Dave Chelsea – assistant engineer
Jack Adams – mastering at The Hit Factory, London

References

Ultravox albums
1993 albums